Supsa is a Black Sea port village in western Georgia with the population of 273 (2014). It is located in the Lanchkhuti Municipality, on the river Supsa.

It is the terminus of the Western Early Oil pipeline from Azerbaijan and the Caspian Sea oil fields. In 2011 a cement plant was put into operation. There is a railway station (Samtredia–Batumi railway) in the village. European route E692 passes through Supsa and has a junction with European route E70 near the village.

See also
 List of ports in Georgia (country)

References

External links

Ports and harbours of Georgia (country)
Populated places in Lanchkhuti Municipality
Georgian Black Sea coast
Port cities in Asia
Port cities in Europe